Jindal is a often used as a family name.

 O. P. Jindal, Indian industrialist and parliamentarian
 Savitri Jindal, chairperson emeritus of Jindal Steel and Power
 Bobby Jindal, politician and former Governor of Louisiana, United States
 Pragun Akhil Jindal, Noted speaker and author of The Black White & Grey.
 Sonal Jindal, Indian businesswoman
 Saharsh Jindal, Economist and Social activist

See also 
 Jindal Group, an Indian conglomerate company founded by O. P. Jindal
 Jindal Steel and Power Limited, led by Naveen Jindal

References 

 
Indian surnames